Anne of Sweden - Swedish: Anna - may refer to:

Anne of Austria, Queen of Poland (1573–1598), Queen consort of Sweden as of 1592
Anne, Princess of Sweden 1470, daughter of King Charles VIII of Sweden
Princess Anna Maria of Sweden (1545–1610) (Anna Maria - Anne Mary)
Anna Vasa of Sweden (1568–1625), Princess of Sweden
Anna Maria, Princess of Sweden 1593, daughter of King Sigismund III Vasa (died young)